Miss International Russia (Russian: Мисс Интернешнл Россия) is a national Beauty pageant in Russia.

History
In 2016 Miss International Russia began to select its winner to the annual Miss International beauty pageant. Russia has been competed since 1994 and received 9 placements (3 runners-up and 6 semi-finalists) between 1994 and 2015.  Before creating Miss International Russia, the delegates audited from casting or finalist at Miss Russia beauty pageant or Miss Moscow/Krasa Rossii winners or sometime the reigning Miss Russia sent to Miss International beauty pageant.

Franchise holders
 Miss USSR pageant (1990)
 Miss Russia pageant (1993 - 2004)
 Krasa Rossii (2007)
 Igor Titov (2008 - 2015)
Anton Paramonov (2016)
Pedro Fransisco and Ekaterina Sharova (2017–Present)

Titleholders
Color key

Notes:
No representatives were sent in 1960-1992, 1995, 1998 and 2005.

Zvezda Rossii Titles

Miss Supranational Russia
Color key

Miss Intercontinental Russia
Color key

See also

Miss Russia
Krasa Rossii
Russia at major beauty pageants

External links
miss-international.ru

References

Recurring events established in 2016
Beauty pageants in Russia
Russia
Russia
Russian awards